Sovetskaya Street is a street in Novosibirsk, Russia. It branches off from Krasny Avenue near the Alexander Nevsky Cathedral and then runs north parallel to it. Sovetskaya Street ends at the intersection with Zheleznodorozhnaya and Pisarev streets.

Sovetskaya Street is the border between the Tsentralny and Zheleznodorozhny districts of the city.

History
The street was previously called the Kabinetskaya Street.

Architecture

Residential and public buildings
 Vagin House is a building on the corner of Sovetskaya and Kommunisticheskaya Street. It was built in 1903.
 Kryukov House is a building on the corner of Sovetskaya and Gorky streets. It was built in 1908 by merchant Kryukov.
 City School Building. It was built in 1912. Architect: Andrey Kryachkov.
 Main Post Office is a building on the corner of Sovetskaya and Lenin streets. It was built in 1916. Architect: Andrey Kryachkov.
 Sibdalgostorg Building (Novosibirsk Conservatory). The building was built in 1924. Architect: Andrey Kryachkov.
 Kondratyuk House. It was built in 1924–1925. In 1927–1930 Yuri Kondratyuk lived and worked in the house.
 House of Textiles is a building on the corner of Sovetskaya and Lenin streets. It was built in 1926.
 The Hospital is a neoclassical building. It was built in 1928.
 Sovetskaya Street 12 is a neoclassical building on the corner of Sovetskaya and Chaplygin streets. It was built in 1955.
 Sovetskaya Street 8. The building was built in 2011.

Religious buildings
 Alexander Nevsky Cathedral
 Orthodox cathedral of the Ascension of Christ in Novosibirsk

Parks
 Pervomaysky Square
 Narymsky Square

Gallery

References

Tsentralny City District, Novosibirsk
Zheleznodorozhny City District, Novosibirsk
Streets in Novosibirsk